Kim Clijsters was the defending champion, having won the previous edition in 2002, but chose not to participate.

Elena-Gabriela Ruse won her maiden WTA Tour singles title as a qualifier, defeating Andrea Petkovic in the final, 7–6(8–6), 6–4.

This tournament marked Dayana Yastremska's return to professional tennis, after her suspension for testing positive for a prohibited substance was lifted by the ITF.

Seeds
The top four seeds received a bye into the second round.

Draw

Finals

Top half

Bottom half

Qualifying

Seeds

Qualifiers

Lucky loser

Draw

First qualifier

Second qualifier

Third qualifier

Fourth qualifier

References

External links
Main draw
Qualifying draw

Women's Singles